Helcyra is a genus of butterflies in the family Nymphalidae.

Species
Helcyra chionippe Felder, 1860 New Guinea
Helcyra superba Leech, 1890 China
Helcyra hemina Hewitson, 1864 – white emperor
Helcyra plesseni (Fruhstorfer, 1913) Taiwan
Helcyra miyamotoi Koiwaya, 2003
Helcyra subalba (Poujade, 1885) China
Helcyra celebensis Martin, 1913 – Sulawesi white emperor

References
"Helcyra Felder, 1860" at Markku Savela's Lepidoptera and Some Other Life Forms

Apaturinae
Nymphalidae genera
Taxa named by Baron Cajetan von Felder